Arco-Íris (Portuguese, 'rainbow') is a Brazilian municipality of the state of São Paulo. The population is 1,773 (2020 est.) in an area of 265 km².

References

Municipalities in São Paulo (state)